Below are the results for season 17 (XVII) of the World Poker Tour (2018-19). 

Beginning this season, all televised final tables will be delayed and played at the Esports Arena at the Luxor in Las Vegas, Nevada.

Results

Gardens Poker Festival

 Casino: The Gardens Casino, Hawaiian Gardens, California
 Buy-in: $5,000
 6-Day Event: July 21-26, 2018
 Number of Entries: 584
 Total Prize Pool: $2,944,800
 Number of Payouts: 73

WPT Choctaw

 Casino: Choctaw Casinos & Resorts, Durant, Oklahoma
 Buy-in: $3,700
 5-Day Event: August 3-7, 2018
 Number of Entries: 755
 Total Prize Pool: $2,548,225
 Number of Payouts: 96

Borgata Poker Open

 Casino: Borgata, Atlantic City, New Jersey
 Buy-in: $3,500
 5-Day Event: September 16-21, 2018
 Number of Entries: 1,075 
 Total Prize Pool: $3,441,075
 Number of Payouts: 136

WPT Maryland at Live! Casino

 Casino: Live! Casino & Hotel, Hanover, Maryland
 Buy-in: $3,500
 5-Day Event: September 21-25, 2018
 Number of Entries: 554
 Total Prize Pool: $1,757,800
 Number of Payouts: 70

bestbet Bounty Scramble

 Casino: bestbet Jacksonville, Jacksonville, Florida
 Buy-in: $5,000
 5-Day Event: October 19-23, 2018
 Number of Entries: 356
 Total Prize Pool: $1,648,280
 Number of Payouts: 45

WPT Montreal

 Casino: Playground Poker Club, Kahnawake, Quebec
 Buy-in: $5,300
 8-Day Event: October 28-November 4, 2018
 Number of Entries: 792
 Total Prize Pool: $5,000,000
 Number of Payouts: 103

Seminole Rock N' Roll Poker Open

 Casino: Seminole Hard Rock Hotel & Casino, Hollywood, Florida
 Buy-in: $3,500
 6-Day Event: November 23-28, 2018
 Number of Entries: 898
 Total Prize Pool: $2,873,600
 Number of Payouts: 113

Five Diamond World Poker Classic

 Casino: Bellagio, Las Vegas, Nevada
 Buy-in: $10,400
 5-Day Event: December 11-15, 2018
 Number of Entries: 1,001
 Total Prize Pool: $9,709,700
 Number of Payouts: 126

Gardens Poker Championship

 Casino: The Gardens Casino, Hawaiian Gardens, California
 Buy-in: $10,000
 5-Day Event: January 12-16, 2019 (Final Table: March 12)
 Number of Entries: 253
 Total Prize Pool: $2,428,800
 Number of Payouts: 32

WPT Russia

 Casino: Casino Sochi, Sochi, Russia
 Buy-in: RUS 198,000
 7-Day Event: January 21-27, 2019
 Number of Entries: 503
 Total Prize Pool: RUS 86,815,190 
 Number of Payouts: 63

Borgata Winter Poker Open

 Casino: Borgata, Atlantic City, New Jersey
 Buy-in: $3,500
 5-Day Event: January 27-31, 2019 (Final Table: March 13)
 Number of Entries: 1,415
 Total Prize Pool: $4,529,415
 Number of Payouts: 177

Fallsview Poker Classic

 Casino: Fallsview Casino, Niagara Falls, Ontario
 Buy-in: $5,000
 3-Day Event: February 23-25, 2019
 Number of Entries: 602
 Total Prize Pool: $2,744,518
 Number of Payouts: 76

L.A. Poker Classic

 Casino: Commerce Casino, Commerce, California
 Buy-in: $10,000
 5-Day Event: March 2-6, 2019 (Final Table: March 11)
 Number of Entries: 546
 Total Prize Pool: $5,169,270
 Number of Payouts: 69

WPT Rolling Thunder

 Casino: Thunder Valley Casino Resort, Lincoln, California
 Buy-in: $5,000
 5-Day Event: March 8-12, 2019
 Number of Entries: 280
 Total Prize Pool: $1,302,000
 Number of Payouts: 35

WPT Barcelona

 Casino: Casino Barcelona, Barcelona, Spain
 Buy-in: €3,300
 7-Day Event: March 11-17, 2019
 Number of Entries: 1,227
 Total Prize Pool: €3,570,570
 Number of Payouts: 151

WPT at Venetian

 Casino: The Venetian, Las Vegas, Nevada
 Buy-in: $3,500
 5-Day Event: March 22-26, 2019
 Number of Entries: 734
 Total Prize Pool: $2,333,800
 Number of Payouts: 92

Seminole Hard Rock Poker Showdown

 Casino: Seminole Hard Rock Hotel & Casino, Hollywood, Florida
 Buy-in: $3,500
 5-Day Event: April 12-16, 2019 (Final Table: May 30)
 Number of Entries: 1,360
 Total Prize Pool: $4,352,000
 Number of Payouts: 170

WPT Choctaw

 Casino: Choctaw Casino Resort, Durant, Oklahoma
 Buy-in: $3,700
 4-Day Event: May 17-20, 2019 (Final Table: May 31)
 Number of Entries: 577
 Total Prize Pool: $1,958,915
 Number of Payouts: 74

Aria Summer Championship

 Casino: Aria Resort & Casino, Las Vegas, Nevada
 Buy-in: $10,000
 4-Day Event: May 27-31, 2019
 Number of Entries: 192
 Total Prize Pool: $1,824,000
 Number of Payouts: 24

WPT Tournament of Champions

 Casino: Aria Resort & Casino, Las Vegas, Nevada
 Buy-in: $15,000
 3-Day Event: June 1-3, 2019
 Number of Entries: 76
 Total Prize Pool: $1,290,000
 Number of Payouts: 10

Player of the Year

External links
Official site

References

World Poker Tour
2018 in poker
2019 in poker